Magdalena Fręch was the defending champion but chose to play at the 2023 Adelaide International 1 instead.

Katie Boulter won the title, defeating Jodie Burrage 3–6, 6–3, 6–2 in the final.

Seeds

Draw

Finals

Top half

Bottom half

References

External links 
Draw

2023 Women's singles
2023 ITF Women's World Tennis Tour